Edward Gerald Patrick Regan (27 December 1900 – ) was a Welsh footballer who played as a half-back. He made appearances in the English Football League for Wrexham and Fulham

References

1900 births
Date of death unknown
People from Saltney
Sportspeople from Flintshire
Welsh footballers
Association football defenders
English Football League players
Wrexham A.F.C. players
Manchester Central F.C. players
Fulham F.C. players
Derry City F.C. players
Belfast Celtic F.C. players
Connah's Quay & Shotton F.C. players
Colwyn Bay F.C. players
Milford United F.C. players
Buckley Town F.C. players